The 1957 Connecticut Huskies baseball team represented the University of Connecticut in the 1957 NCAA University Division baseball season. The Huskies were led by J. O. Christian in his 22nd year as head coach, and played as part of the Yankee Conference. Connecticut posted a 14–10 record and earned an invitation to the 1957 NCAA University Division baseball tournament. They won the District 1 playoffs over  two games to one to earn a berth in the College World Series, their first appearance in the ultimate college baseball event. The Huskies lost their first game against Texas, defeated Florida State and were eliminated by Iowa State.

Roster

Schedule

References 

Connecticut
UConn Huskies baseball seasons
College World Series seasons
Connecticut Huskies baseball